Martin Ruby Krucov Jensen (born 27 July 1978) is a Danish retired football defender.

Career
He was born in Esbjerg and started his career with Esbjerg fB, playing a total 268 games for the club before he joined Sandefjord Fotball in 2007. After five season and 135 matches for Sandefjord, he was awarded the title SF-ambassadør (Ambassador of Sandefjord Fotball) ahead of his last match for Sandefjord, being the first to receiving the award. Ahead of the 2012-season he joined the Norwegian Second Division club Fram Larvik, as an assistant player coach.

He has played three games for the Denmark national under-21 football team.

References

External links
Danish Superliga statistics
Martin Jensen at NFF

1978 births
Living people
People from Esbjerg
Danish men's footballers
Denmark under-21 international footballers
Danish expatriate men's footballers
Esbjerg fB players
Sandefjord Fotball players
IF Fram Larvik players
Eliteserien players
Danish Superliga players
Association football defenders
Danish expatriate sportspeople in Norway
Expatriate footballers in Norway
Sportspeople from the Region of Southern Denmark